{{DISPLAYTITLE:C11H8O3}}
The molecular formula C11H8O3 (molar mass: 188.18 g/mol, exact mass: 188.0473 u) may refer to:

 3-Acetylcoumarin
 3-Hydroxy-2-naphthoic acid
 Plumbagin, or 5-hydroxy-2-methyl-1,4-naphthoquinone